Scott M. Levins (born January 30, 1970) is an American former professional ice hockey player. Levins was born in Spokane, Washington.

Playing career
After a successful junior career with the WHL's Tri-City Americans, Levins was selected by the Winnipeg Jets in the 1990 NHL Entry Draft.

At the NHL level, Levins was used primarily as a grinder and physical presence, as he had difficulty replicating the offensive numbers he had produced in the minors. Levins ultimately played in only nine games in Winnipeg, spending the majority of his time with their farm team, the Moncton Hawks. He was claimed by the Florida Panthers in the 1993 NHL Expansion Draft and after 29 games was dealt to the Ottawa Senators in 1994 in a multi-player deal which saw Bob Kudelski going to Florida. It was in Ottawa that Levins would spend the majority of his NHL career. He would later play briefly with the Phoenix Coyotes before his NHL career came to an end, and he played the rest of his professional career in the minors (IHL, AHL and UHL) and then in Germany (DEL) for Kassel Huskies, Eisbären Berlin and Revierlöwen Oberhausen before heading to the British Ice Hockey Superleague to play for the Sheffield Steelers. He played his last professional season in 2003–04 splitting his time between Columbus Stars of the UHL and the Guildford Flames of the BNL where he won a Play-off Championship.

Career statistics

Regular season and playoffs

Awards
 WHL West Second All-Star Team – 1990

External links

1970 births
American men's ice hockey right wingers
Columbus Stars players
Detroit Vipers players
Eisbären Berlin players
Florida Panthers players
Guildford Flames players
Ice hockey people from Oregon
Ice hockey people from Washington (state)
Kassel Huskies players
Living people
Moncton Hawks players
Ottawa Senators players
Sportspeople from Spokane, Washington
Penticton Knights players
Phoenix Coyotes players
Prince Edward Island Senators players
Quad City Mallards (UHL) players
Revier Löwen players
Sheffield Steelers players
Sportspeople from Portland, Oregon
Springfield Falcons players
Tri-City Americans players
Winnipeg Jets (1979–1996) draft picks
Winnipeg Jets (1979–1996) players